Steps Up is an album by saxophonist Eddie Harris recorded in 1981 and released on the Danish label, SteepleChase.

Track listing
All compositions by Eddie Harris except where noted
 "Steps Up" – 5:13
 "Scandia Skies" (Kenny Dorham) – 5:25
 "Misty Thursday"  (Duke Jordan) – 5:08
 "Freedom Jazz Dance" – 9:45
 "Encirclement" – 8:46
 "If I Did – Would You?" (Jordan) – 6:45
 "Blues at SteepleChase" – 9:56
 "Scandia Skies #2" (Dorham) – 5:40 Additional track on CD

Personnel
Eddie Harris – tenor saxophone
Tete Montoliu – piano
Bo Stief – bass
Norman Fearrington – drums

References

Eddie Harris albums
1981 albums
SteepleChase Records albums